Renilla koellikeri (also spelled R. kollikeri or R. köllikeri) is a species of sea pen that has been reported from the southern coast of California, including Santa Barbara, California.

References

Williams, Gary C. "Index Pennatulacea Annotated Bibliography and Indexes of the Sea Pens (Coelenterata: Octocorallia) of the World 1469-1999". PROCEEDINGS OF THE CALIFORNIA ACADEMY OF SCIENCES. 51 (2): 19-103.

Bioluminescent cnidarians
Renillidae